Events in the year 1931 in China.

Incumbents
Chairman of the Nationalist government: Chiang Kai-shek until December 15, Lin Sen
Premier: Chen Mingshu
Vice Premier: Soong Tse-ven until December 16, Chen Mingshu

Events
March 1-early June - Second Encirclement Campaign against the Honghu Soviet
April 1-May 31 - Second Encirclement Campaign against Jiangxi Soviet
April–July - Second Encirclement Campaign against the Hubei-Henan-Anhui Soviet
July 1-September 18 - Third Encirclement Campaign against Jiangxi Soviet
November 4 - Resistance at Nenjiang Bridge
November 4–18 - Jiangqiao Campaign
November - Establishment of the Chinese Soviet Republic
1931 China floods, one of the deadliest floods in history

September 18 - 918 Incident

Births
February 25 - Li Zhensheng (geneticist)

Deaths
February 7 - Rou Shi, Hu Yepin and Feng Keng; all executed
June 24 - Xiang Zhongfa, executed
August 4 - Cai Hesen, executed
November 29 - Deng Yanda, executed

References

 
1930s in China
Years of the 20th century in China